La Travesia World Tour (English: The Journey Tour) is the world tour by the Dominican superstar Juan Luis Guerra Tour promote his 10th studio album La Llave de Mi Corazon. It was his longest tour at the time and consisted in six legs, 54 shows and visited United States, Latin America, Europe and Asia, where his made his debut in Japan. Also, it was his biggest international tour in more than a decade, marking his first time in many years that he performed in countries such as Ecuador, Paraguay and Costa Rica. since the Bachata Rosa World Tour. The tour kick off on July 12, 2008, and ended on December 5, 2009, in Amsterdam, Netherlands.

Overview 
In Puerto Rico, the first show reported an attendance of 15,000 fans. The first ten concerts in had a total attendance of 100,000 fans. The attendance in Barcelona concert was 10,000. The concerts in Spain had a total attendance of 150,000. On the Latin American Leg, His presetantion in Costa Rica was his first concert in the country in 16 years and had a reported attendance of 8,000. In Venezuela, the concert in Caracas was reported sold out. His concert in natal Santo Domingo, Dominican Republic had attendance of 56,000, the biggest attendance by a Dominican solo artist at the venue. In Chile, the concert was oversaw by 14,000 fans.

On the second Latin American Leg, the concert in Guayaquil had an attendance of nearly 35,000 and more than 20,000 in Quito, it marked his first time performing in te country in 13 years. In Lima, 15,000 fans show up for the concert. The concert in Bolivia was sold out one week before the show with 20,000 tickets sold. On the second leg in the United States, both concerts were reported sold out.

Tour dates

Notes

Box Office Data

Cancelled Concerts

References 

2008 concert tours
2009 concert tours
Juan Luis Guerra